Mangina pulchra is a moth of the family Erebidae. It was described by Charles Swinhoe in 1892. It is found in the Philippines.

References

Nyctemerina
Moths described in 1892
Moths of Asia